René-Philippe van de Werve de Vorsselaer (1850–1911) was a member of the Belgian nobility.

Family 
He was a member of the House of van de Werve, and a descendant of the branch of Charles III Philippe van de Werve, 1st Count of Vosselaer. He was the son of Philippe Marie Joseph Herman, Count van de Werve, and Léocadie Geelhand (1817-1866). He married Louise Bosschaert (1855-1888)

Political career 
From 1892 until 1900 he served as a member of the Belgian Senate for the arrondissement of Turnhout.

References

1850 births
1911 deaths
Rene-Philippe